Chastellux-sur-Cure (literally Chastellux on Cure) is a commune in the Yonne department in Bourgogne-Franche-Comté in north-central France.

The Chateau de Chastellux, the ancestral home of the Chastellux family, is visitable every day after 10am except Monday and Tuesday ( tel: 06-76-75-83-71 or 08-86-34-20-03 ). It is still owned by descendants of Marquis de Chastellux who was second in command ( 1780 to 1782) to the Comte de Rochambeau who led the French military contingent during the American War of Independence.

See also
Communes of the Yonne department
Parc naturel régional du Morvan

References

Communes of Yonne